James Poppitt (26 February 1875–17 June 1930) was an English footballer who played in the Football League for Lincoln City, Notts County and Wolverhampton Wanderers.

References

1875 births
1930 deaths
English footballers
Association football forwards
English Football League players
Telford United F.C. players
Wolverhampton Wanderers F.C. players
Swindon Town F.C. players
Reading F.C. players
Notts County F.C. players
Lincoln City F.C. players